Patrice Laffont (born 21 August 1939 in Marseille) is a French television presenter, actor and entertainer.

Career
During the 1960s Laffont had a passion for acting, where he became a star on stage and screen with his friends Michel Fugain and Michel Sardou. During the 1970s he joined Europe 1 where most of his programmes were produced by Armand Jammot.

His television career includes hosting Des chiffres et des lettres (French original of the UK's Countdown) which he did between 1972 and 1989. Laffont hosted the French version of Fort Boyard until 1999 and Pyramid between 1990 and 1997. Laffont hosted the 2005 edition of Intervilles and presented poker tournaments for Direct 8.

Laffont is the father of Axelle Laffont and Mathilde Laffont.

Filmography

External links
 Official website of Patrice Laffont

1939 births
Living people
Mass media people from Marseille
French television presenters
French comedians
French television personalities